Luke Aikins (born November 21, 1973) is an American professional skydiver, BASE jumper, pilot, and aerial photographer. He is the first person to intentionally dive from mid-tropospheric altitude and land safely without a parachute or a wingsuit and the second skydiver to intentionally jump and safely land without using a parachute.

Aikins is affiliated with Red Bull.

Sky diving
Aikins has coached United States Navy SEALs and NASCAR's Brian Vickers, and has advised the military on skydiving techniques. He is also a safety and training advisor for the United States Parachute Association. He is also an aerial photographer and his photos have been published in major magazines and newspapers. He has completed more than 18,000 jumps since he started skydiving at age 12.

Aikins also worked on stunts in the film Iron Man 3.

In 2020, he helped David Blaine with his Ascension stunt.

July 2016 jump

After about two minutes of free fall he successfully landed in a  net just outside of Simi Valley, California. Aikins reached a terminal velocity of  during the fall. The net was made from Spectra, a high-density polyethylene cord. It had four compressed air cylinders designed to gently slow him down after impact. The first skydiver to intentionally jump and land without using a parachute was Gary Connery in 2012 who wore a wingsuit to aid his landing.

Although several news articles headlines describe Aikins achievement by focusing on the fact that he jumped and went to freefall without parachute, many others have jumped from aircraft without having a parachute when they departed the plane - they were either handed a parachute by a fellow jumper while in freefall or maneuvered to a container carrying a parachute, with first successes dating back to 1965. Others have jumped out of an aircraft and returned to the same or another aircraft without making use of parachute.

Red Bull plane-swap stunt crash

During the highly publicized stunt staged as a Hulu  On-Demand special event, he and his cousin Andy Farrington attempted and failed to swap planes mid air, resulting in the total loss of one plane.

After a swift investigation into a highly publicized stunt exhibition for which he in advance sought and was formally denied permission by the Federal Aviation Administration,  Aikins had his pilot license revoked by the governing body of the FAA.

References

External links

 
 
 
 

1973 births
Living people
American skydivers
American stunt performers
Sports world record holders
People from Pierce County, Washington
Sportspeople from Corpus Christi, Texas